Thaïs is a novel by French writer Anatole France, published in 1890. It is based on events in the life of Saint Thaïs of Egypt, a legendary convert to Christianity who is said to have lived in the 4th century. It was the inspiration for the 1894 opera of the same name by Jules Massenet.

Summary
Paphnuce, an ascetic hermit of the Egyptian desert, journeys to Alexandria to find Thais, the libertine beauty whom he knew as a youth. Masquerading as a dandy, he is able to speak with her about eternity; surprisingly he succeeds in converting her to Christianity. Yet on their return to the desert he becomes fascinated with her former life. She enters a convent to repent of her sins. He cannot forget the pull of her famous beauty, and becomes confused about the values of life. Later, as she is dying and can only see heaven opening before her, he comes to her side and tells her that her faith is an illusion, and that he loves her.

Adaptations
The novel was adapted in 1917 for an American silent film, Thais. In 1984 new adaptation took place for a Polish film Thais directed by Ryszard Ber.

David Frischmann adapted the novel into a short story in Hebrew, called "Ir Hamiklat" ("City of Shelter). He also translated the novel into Hebrew.

The Indian writer Munshi Premchand adapted Thaïs as Ahankar in Hindi. Bhagwati Charan Verma's Chitralekha (1934) was also modelled on France's novel and was adapted to film in 1941 and 1964.

The comic poet Newman Levy reviewed and summarized the story in his poem "Wicked Alexandria" in response to seeing the Massenet opera.  The poem was subsequently popularized as a comic song.

References

External links

Thaïs available at Project Gutenberg
Thais By Anatole France, Urdu Translation
 

1890 French novels
Novels by Anatole France
French novels adapted into films
Novels adapted into operas
Novels set in Egypt
Novels set in the 4th century
Cultural depictions of Thaïs (saint)
Novels adapted for other media